James Brown (born 6 May 1988) is an English professional rugby league footballer who plays as a prop and loose-forward for the Batley Bulldogs in the Betfred Championship. 

He has previously played for the Swinton Lions in the Championship. Brown has also spent time on loan from Batley at the Keighley Cougars in League 1.

References

External links

Batley Bulldogs profile

1988 births
Living people
Batley Bulldogs players
English rugby league players
Keighley Cougars players
Rugby league props
Swinton Lions players